Samuel Timmins (June 1879 – August 1956) was an English professional football wing half who played in the Football League, most notably for Nottingham Forest and West Bromwich Albion. Injury forced his retirement from professional football in 1911.

Personal life 
Timmins attended George Salter School. He served as a gunner in the Royal Garrison Artillery of the British Army during the First World War and saw action on the Italian Front. In 1920, Timmins took over as the licensee of The Hop Pole pub in Carters Green, West Bromwich and continued in the job for over a decade.

Career statistics

References

English footballers
English Football League players
British Army personnel of World War I
Royal Garrison Artillery soldiers
Dudley Town F.C. players
West Bromwich Albion F.C. players
Walsall F.C. players
Sportspeople from West Bromwich
Nottingham Forest F.C. players
Mansfield Town F.C. players
Ashfield United F.C. players
Association football wing halves
1879 births
1956 deaths
British publicans
Nottingham Forest F.C. wartime guest players
Military personnel from Staffordshire